Canons Ashby is a small village and civil parish in West Northamptonshire, England. The population of the village is included in the civil parish of Preston Capes.

Its most notable building is Canons Ashby House, a National Trust property. The parish church is a surviving fragment of Canons Ashby Priory.

A railway station was located between the two villages, on the Stratford-upon-Avon and Midland Junction Railway (later part of the London Midland and Scottish Railway), but the station closed in April 1952.

The village is part of the Daventry constituency.

References

External links 

Canons Ashby "masonic" chamber discovered after 400 years.

Villages in Northamptonshire
West Northamptonshire District
Civil parishes in Northamptonshire